Carlo Domenico del Carretto (1454– 15 August 1514) was an Italian papal legate and Cardinal. He was called the Cardinal of Finale.

Biography
He was born to a noble family of Finale Ligure, the son of Giovanni I Lazzarino, marquis of Finale and Noli and Viscontina Adorno, daughter of Barnaba Adorno, doge of Genoa (1447).

Early life and education
There is no information about his education. He became captain of the papal troops from 1485. Clerk of the Roman Curia until 1489, when he was promoted to episcopacy with the protection of King Louis XII of France.

Episcopate

Del Carretto was named metropolitan archbishop of Cosenza on April 24, 1489 and named administrator of Diocese of Angers on October 10, 1491 until May 15, 1499. On August 16, 1499 he was named titular bishop of Thebae  (nowadays Thebes, Greece) and apostolic nuncio in France in 1503.

Cardinalate

Pope Julius II created him cardinal deacon in the consistory on the December 1, 1505 and published on December 12 the same year with the deaconry of Ss Vito e Modesto. He was promoted cardinal priest with the title of S. Nicola inter Imagines (suppressed title since  April 13, 1587) on January 4, 1507 and appointed metropolitan archbishop to the see of Reims on September 16, 1507. Soon, on April 5, 1509, he was transferred to the metropolitan see of Tours. Named legate in France, he participated in the Papal conclave, 1513. In the Consistory held by Pope Leo X Caretto exercised his option for the title of Santa Cecilia in Trastevere.  A month before his death Pope Leo transferred him to the see of Cahors. Cardinal del Carretto died on August 15, 1514 in Rome. He was buried in his titular church, S. Cecilia.

References

External links

Bernardi, Tiziana. "Del Carretto, Carlo Domenico", Dizionario Biografico degli Italiani  Volume 36 (1988), retrieved: 2017-05-08.

1454 births
1514 deaths
People from the Province of Savona
16th-century Italian cardinals
Archbishops of Reims
Archbishops of Tours
16th-century peers of France
Apostolic Nuncios to France